Sergey Snegov (20 August 1910, in Odessa – 23 February 1994), real surname Kozeryuk, was a Soviet science fiction writer. In 1985, he was awarded the Aelita Prize, the main Soviet prize for science fiction. His science fiction series Humans as Gods was popular in East Germany and in Poland.

External links
Snegov, Sergey Alexandrovich at Laboratory of Fantastic (Russian).

References
The Encyclopedia of Science Fiction page 1040.

1910 births
1994 deaths
Writers from Odesa
Russian science fiction writers
Soviet science fiction writers
Soviet male writers
20th-century Russian male writers